The Palawan–Albay Queens' Gambit is a professional chess club which plays in the Professional Chess Association of the Philippines (PCAP) associated with the provinces of Palawan and Albay. It is noted for having an all-female roster in a professional league where most players are male.

History
The Palawan Queens' Gambit was formed as a representative team of the province of Palawan at the Professional Chess Association of the Philippines (PCAP), the first professional chess league in the Philippines. Owned by Palawan-based businessman, Jojo Mitra they formed an all-female team, and deliberately picked female players at the inaugural PCAP draft. Palawan employed Susan Neri, daughter of an Aklan-based national master and international arbiter, as their coach who got enticed with the idea of mentoring an all-female team.

By the Open Conference of the 2022 PCAP season, the team's name was changed to the Palawan–Albay Queens' Gambit.

Roster
The following is the Palawan–Albay Queens' Gambit roster for the 2021 PCAP season.
Marie Antoinette San Diego (WIM)
Mikee Charlene Suede (WIM)
Catherine Pereña-Secopito
Shania Mae Mendoza
Carmelita Abanes (WNM)
Cecilia Cuizon (WNM) 
Marife Dela Torre*
Yanika Eli Seratubias*
Jesibel Maberit*

Coach: Susan Neri

Team image
The Palawan–Albay Queens' Gambit is named after the Netflix series, The Queen's Gambit which features a female protagonist. The team features an all-female lineup as a means to give more opportunities for women in the Philippines to play competitive chess.

References

2020 establishments in the Philippines
Chess clubs in the Philippines
Queens' Gambit, Palawan
Women's chess
Women's sports teams
Women's sports teams in the Philippines
Sports in Albay